Burra Burra was an electoral district of the House of Assembly in the Australian state of South Australia from 1902 to 1938.

After a boundary redistribution in 1902, the Electoral district of Burra was abolished and the new district of Burra Burra was created.

The town of Burra is currently located in the safe Liberal seat of Stuart.

Members

References

External links
The 13 electorates from 1902 to 1915: The Adelaide Chronicle

Former electoral districts of South Australia
1902 establishments in Australia
1938 disestablishments in Australia